Le Tricorne is a painted stage curtain created in 1919 by the Spanish artist Pablo Picasso for the Ballets Russes production of The Three-Cornered Hat. 

It was later purchased for $50,000 USD by Phyllis Lambert, the daughter of Samuel Bronfman, the founder of the Seagram empire. The curtain, sized 19 by 20 feet,  hung for many years in The Four Seasons Restaurant in the Seagram Building in New York City.  In 2015 the work entered the collection of the New York Historical Society, where it remains as of 2021.

References

Pablo Picasso
1919 in art